Kaşlıca can refer to:

 Kaşlıca, Maden
 Kaşlıca, Tut
 Kaşlıca, Yüreğir